Richwoods Township may refer to:

 Richwoods Township, Jackson County, Arkansas, in Jackson County, Arkansas
 Richwoods Township, Lawrence County, Arkansas, in Lawrence County, Arkansas
 Richwoods Township, Lonoke County, Arkansas, in Lonoke County, Arkansas
 Richwoods Township, Sharp County, Arkansas, in Sharp County, Arkansas
 Richwoods Township, Stone County, Arkansas, in Stone County, Arkansas
 Richwoods Township, Peoria County, Illinois
 Richwoods Township, Miller County, Missouri
 Richwoods Township, Washington County, Missouri

See also 
 Richwood Township (disambiguation)

Township name disambiguation pages